West Creek flows through Seward, New York, and Hyndsville, New York, before converging with Cobleskill Creek in Warnerville, New York.

References 

Rivers of New York (state)
Rivers of Schoharie County, New York